Lagenosoma is a genus of flies in the family Stratiomyidae.

Species
Lagenosoma dispar Brauer, 1882
Lagenosoma picta Brauer, 1882
Lagenosoma propinqua Brauer, 1882

References

Stratiomyidae
Brachycera genera
Taxa named by Friedrich Moritz Brauer
Diptera of Australasia